This is a list of places on the Victorian Heritage Register in the Borough of Queenscliffe in Victoria, Australia. The Victorian Heritage Register is maintained by the Heritage Council of Victoria.

The Victorian Heritage Register, as of 2020, lists the following 16 state-registered places within the Borough of Queenscliffe:

References

Queenscliffe
Borough of Queenscliffe